Sangatpur is a village in Punjab, Tehsil Phagwara, Kapurthala district, in India, The village of Begampur is administratively part of Sangatpur and is a relatively new settlement. Neighbouring villages include Lakhpur, Mahliana, Malikhpur, Chak Prema, Ghummana, Pandori and Akalgarh.

Demographics
According to the 2001 Census, Sangatpur has 2,260 people.

The village has a Gurdwara, a Quilla (fort), shops, a primary school, a Shiv Mandir and Ma Kaali Temple. Sangatpur is famous for the annual Baba Shah Fateh Ali Mela which attracts a large attendance.

References

Villages in Kapurthala district